The 1992 Yukon general election was held on October 19, 1992 to elect members of the 28th Legislative Assembly of the territory of Yukon, Canada. It was won by the Yukon Party.

Results by party

|- style="background:#ccc;"
! rowspan="2" colspan="2" style="text-align:left;"|Party
! rowspan="2" style="text-align:left;"|Party leader
!rowspan="2"|Candidates
! colspan="4" style="text-align:center;"|Seats
!colspan="3" style="text-align:center;"|Popular vote
|- style="background:#ccc;"
| style="text-align:center;"|1989
| style="text-align:center;font-size: 80%;"|Dissol.
| style="text-align:center;"|1992
| style="text-align:center;"|Change
| style="text-align:center;"|#
| style="text-align:center;"|%
| style="text-align:center;"|Change

|align=left|John Ostashek
|align="right"|14
|align="right"|7
|align="right"|7
|align="right"|7
|align="right"|0
|align="right"|4,675
|align="right"|35.88%
|align="right"|-8.14%

|align=left|Tony Penikett
|align="right"|17
|align="right"|9
|align="right"|9
|align="right"|6
|align="right"|-3
|align="right"|4,571
|align="right"|35.08%
|align="right"|-9.81%

| colspan="2" style="text-align:left;"|Independent
|align="right"|7
|align="right"|0
|align="right"|0
|align="right"|3
|align="right"|+3
|align="right"|1,686
|align="right"|12.94%
|align="right"|N/A

|align=left|Paul Thériault
|align="right"|14
|align="right"|0
|align="right"|0
|align="right"|1
|align="right"|+1
|align="right"|2,098
|align="right"|16.10%
|align="right"|+5.01%
|-
| style="text-align:left;" colspan="3"|Total
| style="text-align:right;"|52
| style="text-align:right;"|16
| style="text-align:right;"|16
| style="text-align:right;"|17
| style="text-align:right;"|+1
| style="text-align:right;"|13,030
| style="text-align:right;"|100.00%
| style="text-align:right;"|
|}

Incumbents not Running for Reelection
The following MLAs had announced that they would not be running in the 1992 election:

New Democratic Party
Maurice Byblow (Faro)
Norma Kassi (Vuntut Gwitchin)

Yukon Party
Dan Lang (Whitehorse Porter Creek East)

Riding Results
Bold indicates party leaders
† - denotes a retiring incumbent MLA

|-
| style="background:whitesmoke;"|Faro
|
|
|
|Jim McLachlan337
||
|Trevor Harding388
|
|
||
|Maurice Byblow†
|-
| style="background:whitesmoke;"|Klondike
||
|David Millar409
|
|
|
|Art Webster355
|
|
||
|Art Webster
|-
| style="background:whitesmoke;"|Kluane
||
|Bill Brewster377
|
|
|
|Wolf Riedl256
|
|
||
|Bill Brewster
|-
| style="background:whitesmoke;"|Lake Laberge
||
|Mickey Fisher345
|
|Bonnie Hurlock210
|
|Sandra Gibbs192
|
|Chris Gladish223
||
|New District
|-
| style="background:whitesmoke;"|McIntyre-Takhini
|
|Scott Howell290
|
|Larry Bill126
||
|Piers McDonald313
|
|
||
|New District
|-
| style="background:whitesmoke;"|Mayo-Tatchun
|
|Si Mason-Wood264
|
|Roddy Blackjack99
||
|Danny Joe297
|
|
||
|New District
|-
| style="background:whitesmoke;"|Mount Lorne
|
|Chuck Walker302
|
|Roger Moore89
||
|Lois Moorcroft316
|
|Barb Harris202
||
|New District
|-
| style="background:whitesmoke;"|Porter Creek North
||
|John Ostashek474
|
|Eldon Organ125
|
|Carl Rumscheidt301
|
|
||
|New District
|-
| style="background:whitesmoke;"|Porter Creek South
|
|
|
|Shayne Fairman261
|
|Brian McLaughlin240
||
|Alan Nordling435
||
|New District
|-
| style="background:whitesmoke;"|Riverdale North
||
|Doug Phillips557
|
|Lesley Cabott106
|
|Lucy Van Oldenbarneveld292
|
|
||
|Doug Phillips
|-
| style="background:whitesmoke;"|Riverdale South
|
|Dale Stokes293
|
|Paul Thériault48
|
|Maurice Byblow242
||
|Bea Firth384
||
|Bea Firth
|-
| style="background:whitesmoke;"|Riverside
|
|Nancy Huston265
||
|Jack Cable291
|
|Joyce Hayden212
|
|
||
|New District
|-
| style="background:whitesmoke;"|Ross River-Southern Lakes
|
|
|
|Jim Smarch45
|
|Sam Johnston234
||
|Willard Phelps338Timothy Cant92
||
|New District
|-
| style="background:whitesmoke;"|Vuntut Gwitchin
||
|Johnny Abel96
|
|
|
|Grafton Njootli56
|
|
||
|Norma Kassi†
|-
| style="background:whitesmoke;"|Watson Lake
||
|John Devries485
|
|Ron Lutz56
|
|Karel Kauppinen285
|
|
||
|John Devries
|-
| style="background:whitesmoke;"|Whitehorse Centre
|
|Chuck Rear286
|
|Phil Wheelton191
||
|Margaret Commodore288
|
|
||
|Margaret Commodore
|-
| style="background:whitesmoke;"|Whitehorse West
|
|Bob Bruneau232
|
|Shaun Patrick Dennehy114
||
|Tony Penikett304
|
|Bernd Schmidt12
||
|Tony Penikett
|}

References

1992
1992 elections in Canada
Election
October 1992 events in Canada